The 185th Infantry Brigade (185 Bde) was an infantry brigade formation of the British Army raised during the Second World War that participated in the Normandy landings of 6 June 1944, fighting in the Normandy Campaign and the subsequent campaign in North-West Europe with the 3rd British Infantry Division.

History
The Brigade was formed on 1 September 1942 by redesignation of 204th Independent Infantry Brigade (Home), a static Home Defence formation serving under Durham and North Riding Area HQ. It was assigned frontline infantry battalions and became the infantry component of the new 79th Armoured Division. When 79th Armoured was reorganised as a specialist armour formation in April 1943, 185th Brigade transferred to the 3rd Infantry Division, training for Operation Overlord. The 3rd Infantry Division was the first British formation to land at Sword on D-Day. During the often intense fighting from Sword to Bremen, the 3rd Infantry Division suffered 2,586 killed with over 12,500 wounded or missing. Throughout the North West Europe Campaign, two members of the brigade (and division) were awarded the Victoria Cross. They were Corporal Sidney Bates of the 1st Battalion, Royal Norfolk Regiment and Private James Stokes of the 2nd Battalion, King's Shropshire Light Infantry.

Composition

The following units comprised 185th Brigade from its formation until August 1945:
 2nd Battalion, Royal Warwickshire Regiment
 1st Battalion, Royal Norfolk Regiment (until 17 August 1945)
 2nd Battalion, King's Shropshire Light Infantry
 1st Battalion, Highland Light Infantry (from 19 August 1945)

Commanders
185th Brigade's wartime commanders were:
 Brigadier G. McI. S. Bruce (until 4 June 1943)
 Brigadier K.P. Smith (17 June 1943 – 2 July 1944)
 Brigadier Eric Bols (2 July–11 December 1944)
 Brigadier E.H.G. Grant (11 December 1944 – 15 January 1945)
 Brigadier F.R.G. Matthews (from 20 January 1945)

Sword 
Sword was the codename of one of the five main landing beaches in Operation Neptune, the initial assault phase of Operation Overlord, the Allied invasion of Normandy on 6 June 1944.

Stretching 8 km from Ouistreham to Saint-Aubin-sur-Mer it was the furthest east of the landing points and around 15 km from Caen. The landing site was divided into four zones — Oboe, Peter, Queen and Roger (west-east). The German Army's defences consisted of beach obstacles, anti-tank ditches, mines, machine guns and mortars at the beaches and across the River Orne at Merville there were heavy guns. The defending troops belonged to the 716th Static Infantry Division and could call on the support of the nearby 21st Panzer division. The landing forces were the British I Corps, comprising the 3rd British Infantry Division and the 27th Armoured Brigade.

As well as being the furthest east of the landing beaches, Sword was also the smallest, only wide enough for a brigade-sized landing force. The 3rd British Division had the task of getting enough troops ashore to push inland quickly and seize Caen, and link up with the British 6th Airborne Division, which had dropped in the night before in Operation Tonga.

Sword experienced the only counter-attack by the Germans on 6 June. British troops had been unable to link up with the 3rd Canadian Division on Juno, as had been planned and they were attacked by the 21st Panzer Division, veterans of the Western Desert Campaign. The 192nd Panzer Grenadier Regiment had reached Sword by 2000 hours but were subject to aerial attacks and were destroyed by the Royal Air Force (RAF) and the tanks of the 27th Armoured Brigade which had landed on Sword.

By the end of the day, 29,000 men had been landed at Sword with 630 casualties. Allied forces had advanced about four miles inland, the situation was stable and a link up with the Canadians on Juno had been established. However the major objective of Caen which was to have been captured on D Day still evaded them. There would be fierce fighting around the area for the next 6 weeks, known as the Battle for Caen.

The 185th Brigade went on to fight at Bourguebus Ridge, Mont Pincon, the Nederrijn, the Rhineland, and across the Rhine River. By the end of the war the 185th Brigade had been awarded both the VCs awarded to the 3rd Division and had suffered more casualties than the other two infantry brigades.

References

Bibliography
 Patrick Delaforce, Monty's Iron Sides, Stroud: Alan Sutton, 1995,
 

Military units and formations established in 1942
Infantry brigades of the British Army
Infantry brigades of the British Army in World War II
1942 establishments in the United Kingdom